Joshua Cohen (born 1951) is an American philosopher specializing in political philosophy.  He has taught at Stanford University and Massachusetts Institute of Technology and is currently a member of the faculty at Apple University and the University of California, Berkeley.

Education and career

Cohen earned B.A. and M.A. degrees in philosophy from Yale University in 1973, and earned his Ph.D. at Harvard University under the direction of John Rawls in 1979.  He taught at MIT from 1979 until 2007, when he moved to Stanford University.  At Stanford, he was Marta Sutton Weeks Professor of Ethics in Society (2008–2014) and professor of political science, philosophy, and law (2006–2014) At Stanford, Cohen was also one of the program leaders (along with Larry Diamond and Terry Winograd) for the Program on Liberation Technologies at Stanford's Freeman Spogli Institute for International Studies.  Cohen became part of the faculty of Apple University in 2011, joining full-time on October 15, 2014 and resigning from Stanford.  He also spends one day a week running a law and philosophy workshop series at the University of California, Berkeley.

He has published articles and books in political philosophy, including deliberative democracy, and global justice, as well as such topics as freedom of expression, electoral finance, and new models of democratic governance. His 2012 Comte Lectures at the London School of Economics discussed the issues he teaches about: mobile for development and human-centered design.

Since 1991, Cohen has served as editor of Boston Review, with Deb Chasman joining as coeditor in 2002.

Books
 
 
 
  with Paul Q. Hirst, Claus Offe, Jane Mansbridge, Andrew Szasz, Andrew Levine, Philippe C. Schmitte, Wolfgang Streeck, Ira Katznelson, Ellen M. Immergut, Iris Marion Young, and Heinz Klug.
 
  Originally an essay (pdf).

See also
 American philosophy
 List of American philosophers

References

External links

Video debates featuring Cohen on Bloggingheads.tv
 2011 Dewey Lecture at University of Chicago
 Joshua Cohen Playlist Appearance on WMBR's Dinnertime Sampler radio show April 2, 2003
Joshua Cohen's 2012 Comte Lectures On mobile-for-development and human-centered design.

1951 births
Living people
20th-century American philosophers
American political philosophers
Harvard Graduate School of Arts and Sciences alumni
Stanford University Department of Philosophy faculty
Yale College alumni
Yale Graduate School of Arts and Sciences alumni